Atherigona atripalpis, the foxtail millet shoot fly, is a species of fly in the family Muscidae. It is found in East Asia and South Asia. Its host range includes the Setaria species Setaria italica, Setaria glauca, and Setaria plicata.

References

Muscidae
Insect pests of millets
Taxa named by John Russell Malloch